Dasyatis marmorata, the marbled stingray, is a species of stingray of the family Dasyatidae. Its geographic range covers the central and south-eastern Atlantic, from Morocco to South Africa. It is also present in the coastal waters of southern Mediterranean Sea and the Levantine Basin. This bottom-dweller generally inhabits sandy or muddy flats near rocky reefs and kelp forests, to a depth of 50 m (164 ft).

References 

marmorata